Jarosław Florczak (1969 – 10 April 2010) was a Polish officer of Government Protection Bureau.

He died in the 2010 Polish Air Force Tu-154 crash near Smolensk on 10 April 2010. He was posthumously awarded the Order of Polonia Restituta.

References

1969 births
2010 deaths
Recipients of the Bronze Cross of Merit (Poland)
Knights of the Order of Polonia Restituta
Victims of the Smolensk air disaster